Do Sangan (also Romanized as Do Sangān and Dowsangān; also known as Dowsankāl and Tūsangān) is a village in Sonbolabad Rural District, Soltaniyeh District, Abhar County, Zanjan Province, Iran. At the 2006 census, its population was 376, in 80 families.

References 

Populated places in Abhar County